Jules Cardot (18 August 1860 – 22 November 1934) was a French botanist and bryologist considered in his time one of the world's leading experts on the mosses of Antarctica. 

He was the son-in-law of botanist Louis Piré.
His collection of herbarium specimens at his laboratories in Charleville was heavily looted and damaged during World War I. The French Academy of Sciences awarded the 1893 "Prix Montague" to Cardot for his work on mosses. Cardot named 40 genera and 1200 species.

Works 
Cardot, J.  Nouvelle contribution à la flore bryologique des îles atlantiques. // Bull.Herb.Boissier.Sér.2., Geneva. Impr. Romanet. Vol. v (2). Feb. 1905

References

19th-century French botanists
Bryologists
1860 births
1934 deaths
20th-century French botanists